Johanna Hilli (born 14 May 1994) is a Finnish handball player for GRIFK Handboll and the Finnish national team.

References

1994 births
Living people
Finnish female handball players
Sportspeople from Espoo